Parker Place (百家店) is a   shopping mall in Richmond, British Columbia. It is located on No. 3 Road, in Richmond's Golden Village, the main Asian district. It primarily serves the Asian Canadian population of Richmond.

It contains about 150 stores. Its Chinese name literally translates to "Hundred Stores". Most of its stores are mid-sized and there are no real dominant tenants.

In popular culture
Parker Place was one of the filming locations in the CBC Television miniseries Dragon Boys.

See also
Chinese Canadians in British Columbia
Aberdeen Centre
Richmond Centre
Golden Village (Richmond, British Columbia)

References

External links
 Parker Place official site

Shopping malls in Metro Vancouver
Buildings and structures in Richmond, British Columbia
1993 establishments in British Columbia
Shopping malls established in 1993